Bhatkhola may refer to:
 Bhatkhola, village development committee in Syangja District
 Bhotkhola Rural Municipality, rural municipality in Sankhuwasabha District